San Maurizio is a Neoclassical-style, deconsecrated church located in the campo San Maurizio in the sestiere of San Marco of the city of Venice, Italy. It now is a Museum focusing on the music of Baroque Venice.

A church was present at the site before the first reconstruction in the 16th century. A further reconstruction took place in 1806 by the La Fenice's architect Giannantonio Selva. It once housed a studio of a young Antonio Canova. Near the church was built the scuola degli Albanesi. The present structure is mainly a design of the Neoclassic architect Giovanni Antonio Selva.

The church now houses the Museo della Musica, museum of baroque instruments, composers, and music of Venice. It features period instruments, and documents, including exhibits on Antonio Vivaldi, but also documents on Amati, Giovanni Battista Guadagnini, and Francesco and Matteo Goffriller. Entrance, as of 2020, is free.

Exterior

Interior

Museo della Musica

See also 
 List of music museums

Sources

Roman Catholic churches in Venice
16th-century Roman Catholic church buildings in Italy
Neoclassical architecture in Venice
Museums in Venice
Music museums in Italy
Musical instrument museums in Italy
Neoclassical church buildings in Italy